Russell Common is a historic row house at 2—10 Park Terrace in Arlington, Massachusetts.  It is located just northeast of the center of town, behind the retail stores on Massachusetts Avenue. It is accessible from the municipal lot behind the Jefferson Cutter House (entries from Mystic St. and Medford St.)  The -story building is a rare example of a multiunit Shingle style building, and was designed by the locally prominent firm of Gay & Proctor.  It was built for its proximity to the railroad, but is now surrounded by the commercial center of Arlington, and a parking lot that was a park at the time of its construction.

The building was listed on the National Register of Historic Places in 1985.

See also
National Register of Historic Places listings in Arlington, Massachusetts

References

Buildings and structures in Arlington, Massachusetts
Residential buildings on the National Register of Historic Places in Massachusetts
National Register of Historic Places in Arlington, Massachusetts